The New Galilee is the name given in the Western Wisdom Teachings to ‘a new heaven and a new earth’  mentioned in the Bible.  From the viewpoint of these Christian esoteric teachings, the New Galilee represents the future Sixth Epoch in mankind's evolutionary path and will see the transition of humanity to the etheric region of the Earth, where “sorrow and pain will cease and he[man] will have entered the path to the city of peace--Jer-u-salem, the future New Jerusalem to be established within, the heavenly ‘bride’ of the Christ's Race in the making.”

Usage in the Western Wisdom Teachings
According to the Rosicrucian writings of Max Heindel the sixth sub-race of the current Aryan Epoch (the fifth epoch) has evolved among the Slavic peoples and the seventh sub-race is now evolving from this sixth sub-race. Heindel refers that the United States is the melting pot to form the last race in human evolution that will exist at the beginning of the Sixth Epoch, the New Galilee:

See also
Second Coming (Esoteric Christian teachings)
Last Judgment (Esoteric Christian tradition)
The New Earth

References

External links
 Rays from the Rose Cross: Christ is the Divine Messenger

Astrological ages
Christian cosmology
Christian eschatology
Esoteric Christianity
Rosicrucianism